Nahmad is a surname. Notable people with the surname include:

David Nahmad (born 1947), Monegasque billionaire art dealer
Ezra Nahmad (born 1945), Monegasque billionaire art dealer and collector
Joseph Nahmad (born 1990), American art dealer
Giuseppe Nahmad (1932–2012), Italian art dealer of Syrian Jewish descent
Helly Nahmad:
Helly Nahmad (London), British art dealer
Helly Nahmad (New York art collector), American art dealer

See also

Jewish surnames